Verosvres is a commune in the Saône-et-Loire department in the region of Bourgogne-Franche-Comté in eastern France.

History 
The name Verosvres is derived from the Gallic word Verobriga, vero meaning "true" or "good" and briga meaning "fortress": thus giving "Good castle".

In 1920, the town of Verosvres formed "an agglomeration of about eighty houses, including one for the post office and telegraph." The town was then served by a railway line, now defunct, which connected Paray-le-Monial to Mâcon, and stopped at a station called "Les Terreaux — Verosvres".

Notable people
 Verosvres is the birthplace of Saint Margaret Mary Alacoque, who first inspired devotion to the Sacred Heart of Jesus in the Roman Catholic Church.
 Pierre Albuisson (born in 1952), French postage stamp engraver and designer, presides the Art du timbre gravé association whose headquarters are located in Verosvres.

See also
Communes of the Saône-et-Loire department

References

Communes of Saône-et-Loire